Lloyd Miller (26 August 1915 – 6 January 1985) was an Australian athlete who competed in the 1938 British Empire Games.

In 1938 he won the silver medal in the triple jump event at the Empire Games.

References

External links 
 
 

1915 births
1985 deaths
Australian male triple jumpers
Athletes (track and field) at the 1938 British Empire Games
Commonwealth Games silver medallists for Australia
Commonwealth Games medallists in athletics
Medallists at the 1938 British Empire Games